Jean Louisa Kelly (born March 9, 1972) is an American actress and singer. After making her film debut as Tia Russell in Uncle Buck (1989) alongside John Candy, she appeared in a wide range of other films including The Fantasticks (1995) and Mr. Holland's Opus (1995). From 2000 to 2006, she portrayed Kim Warner on the CBS sitcom Yes, Dear.

Career
Before attending college, she already had roles in the original Broadway cast of Sondheim's Into the Woods (as Snow White and understudy to Rapunzel and Little Red Ridinghood) and as Tia Russell in the film Uncle Buck with John Candy.  She also took roles in college productions, including with the Barnard College Gilbert and Sullivan Society.

In the mid-1990s, after graduating from Columbia University, Kelly became well known  for a series of television commercials she did for MCI long distance, in which she played a telephone operator who challenged AT&T. In 1995, she starred as Luisa in the musical film The Fantasticks with Joey McIntyre and Joel Grey, although the film was shelved until 2000. The same year, she appeared as Rowena Morgan, the muse for the title character of Mr. Holland's Opus.  In the 1990s, other films followed, including “Origin of the Species,” “The Day Lincoln was Shot” and  Landfall (2001).  Kelly appeared Off Broadway at the York Theatre in the title role in Paul McKibbins and B.T. McNicholl's The It Girl, based on the 1927 movie It. She also appeared in the York's "Musicals in Mufti" series as Lois Lane in It's a Bird, It's a Plane, It's Superman.

In 1996, Kelly voiced the title role in the second season of the animated series Princess Gwenevere and the Jewel Riders. After several made-for-TV movies, Kelly's broadest exposure came from her roles in situation comedies, first guest starring in such shows as Mad About You, and then as a cast member of the short-lived NBC version of Cold Feet. From 2000 to 2006, she starred as Kim Warner on the long-running sitcom Yes, Dear. In 2006 she guest starred in the ABC drama Grey's Anatomy. After her series ended, she guest starred on numerous television shows and starred in movies of the week. She recurred as Bernice Pope in the Yahoo production of Sin City Saints.

She played opposite William Fichtner in the movie “The Neighbor” and opposite John Diehl in “Out of the Wild” in 2015. In 2019 she played opposite Bradley Whitford in “Call of the Wild,” and played Jane Doe/Serena May in the James Wan movie “Malignant.”

She released an album of children's music called Color of Your Heart in 2013.  In 2015, she released a five-song EP called Willing, and in 2017 she released an album titled "For My Folks", which features a collection of standards.

Kelly appears as Sarah Kazansky - wife of Val Kilmer's character Tom "Iceman" Kazansky - in the 2022 action drama movie Top Gun: Maverick.

Personal life
Kelly was born in Worcester, Massachusetts, the daughter of  J. Joseph Kelly III and Wendy Kelly. Her father was a high school English teacher, and her mother taught piano. She attended Easton High School in Easton, Maryland. In 1994, Kelly graduated from Columbia University's Columbia College with a Bachelor of Arts in English.

In 1997, she married James Pitaro. They have two children. 

She is close friends with Jennifer Garner, having hosted the baby shower for Garner's daughter Violet Anne Affleck and interviewed Garner for Self magazine in 2005.

Filmography

Film

Television

Notes

External links 

 
 March 1996 article in the Columbia University Record
 
 

1972 births
Actresses from Los Angeles
Actresses from Massachusetts
Actresses from Worcester, Massachusetts
American child actresses
American Congregationalists
American women singers
American film actresses
American musical theatre actresses
American television actresses
Columbia College (New York) alumni
Living people
20th-century American actresses
21st-century American actresses